Science and Technology of Advanced Materials is a peer-reviewed scientific journal in materials science that was established in 2000. In 2008 it became an open access journal through the sponsorship of the National Institute for Materials Science (NIMS). The journal is international; it is managed by NIMS, which was joined in 2014 by the Swiss Federal Laboratories for Materials Science and Technology (Empa). Currently STAM is an electronic journal, its articles are continuously published online. Its sister journal, STAM Methods, has been launched in 2021.

Scope 
The journal covers all aspects of materials science, including theoretical analysis, synthesis and processing, phase and structure analyses, characterization, properties, engineering, and applications. It covers advances in research on solids, liquids and colloids, with emphasis on the interdisciplinary nature of materials science and issues at the forefront of the field, such as nano-, bio- and eco- and energy materials.

License 
Since March 2014, STAM articles are published under a Creative Commons CC-BY license, while the previous content is either copyrighted or released within a non-commercial CC-BY-NC-SA platform.

Indexing
STAM is indexed by major databases including the Astrophysics Data System, Chemical Abstracts Service,  Inspec, PubMed, Science Citation Index, Scopus and Web of Science.

Impact 
According to the Journal Citation Reports, STAM has a 2021 impact factor of 7.821.

STAM has published articles and editorials by the Nobel Laureates Ei-ichi Negishi, Heinrich Rohrer and Dan Shechtman.  Its editorial board includes Katsuhiko Ariga, Robert Chang, James Gimzewski, Michael Grätzel, Hideo Hosono, Colin Humphreys, Yoshinori Tokura and Yoshihisa Yamamoto.

References

External links 
  (English)
 Japanese website
STAM hub

Open access journals
Taylor & Francis academic journals
Materials science journals
English-language journals
Publications established in 2000
Continuous journals
Creative Commons Attribution-licensed journals